Mountain Hill may refer to:

Mountain Hill, Georgia
Mountain Hill, Virginia